Patricia Bragg is an American businesswoman, author, and health consultant. She serves as the nominal head of Bragg Live Food Products and Books, and Chairperson of the Bragg Health Institute.

Patricia Bragg was born as Patricia Pendleton in Oakland, California, on April 29, 1929, daughter of Harry Clay Pendleton (1874–1961), a building contractor, and Nettie (née Coward) Deacon Pendleton (1898–1964). Bragg was raised in Piedmont, California, where she attended both grammar school and high school. She graduated from Mary Wallace School, a private Piedmont high school for girls, in June 1947.

After finishing high school, she attended the University of California, Berkeley for two years. In an interview published in the Santa Barbara News-Press on March 8, 2011, Bragg said she graduated from that institution with a "bachelor's degree in biochemistry".

On April 19, 1952, Patricia Pendleton and Robert E. Bragg (1922–1993) married at the First Presbyterian Church in Phoenix, Arizona. The marriage did not last long and they divorced in 1957, in Los Angeles County, California. Prior to and following their divorce proceedings, Bragg assisted her former father-in-law, Paul C. Bragg, with his health crusades. She later appeared on his Health & Happiness TV show, which ran from September 1959 to an unknown date on Channel 9, KHJ-TV, in Los Angeles, CA. She is attributed as a co-author of many of the later Bragg health books.

References

External links
 Braggs Website
 Patricia Bragg interview
 LA Times Story

1929 births
Living people
American women in business
People from Piedmont, California
University of California alumni
21st-century American women